Randy Craig Wolfe (February 20, 1951 – January 2, 1997), known as Randy California, was an American guitarist, singer and songwriter, and one of the original members of the rock group Spirit, formed in 1967.

Life and career
California was born as Randy Craig Wolfe into a musical Jewish family in Los Angeles and spent his early years studying varied styles at the family's Los Angeles folk club, the Ash Grove, which was founded by his uncle, Ed Pearl. He was 15 years old when his mother Bernice Pearl and new stepfather, Ed Cassidy (later to become a founding member of the band Spirit, with Randy), moved to New York City in the summer of 1966 because Cassidy had a number of jazz gigs lined up. It was there, at Manny's Music, that Randy met Jimi Hendrix. 

He played in Hendrix's band Jimmy James and the Blue Flames that summer. California, Cassidy and Pearl lived in an apartment building in Forest Hills, Queens called the Balfour, whose other residents included future Steely Dan co-founder Walter Becker, who cited California's blues-based guitar style as an influence on his own playing. 

The stage name "Randy California" was given to him by Hendrix to distinguish him from another Randy in the band, Randy Palmer, whom Hendrix dubbed "Randy Texas". When Hendrix and California were invited to come to England by Chas Chandler, former bassist of British Invasion band the Animals—who became Hendrix's manager and producer—Randy's parents refused to allow him to go, insisting the 15-year-old stay and finish high school. By some accounts, Chandler wanted Hendrix as the only guitarist for the band and nixed California's going to England.

Together with Cassidy, songwriter/front-man Jay Ferguson, bassist Mark Andes (with whom California and Cassidy had initially formed a band called the Red Roosters) and keyboardist John Locke, California founded the band Spirit. Their first, self-titled album was released in January 1968, a month before California's 17th birthday. 

He then wrote the band's biggest hit, 1968's "I Got a Line on You" for Spirit's second album, The Family That Plays Together. He also wrote the visionary single "1984", inspired by George Orwell's novel of the same name, about the United States government's own deception and control at the time. Released in early 1970, "the song was so pointed against the U.S. government that it was banned from many radio stations, although it was a huge hit in Germany." California also wrote Spirit's other hit, "Nature's Way", for the band's best-selling album, Twelve Dreams of Dr. Sardonicus.

Career
Spirit was invited to open for Jimi Hendrix at Woodstock. However, band manager/producer Lou Adler—who had been one of the founders of the rock festival movement two years earlier, as a partner (with Mamas & Papas linchpin John Phillips) in the Monterey Pop Festival, where Hendrix premiered in the U.S.—opposed it because the band was busy promoting their latest album, Clear.

When Ferguson and Andes left Spirit to form Jo Jo Gunne due to the slow sales of Sardonicus, and then his dear friend Hendrix died, a depressed California left Spirit. He recorded Kapt. Kopter & The Fabulous Twirly Birds, which included California and Cassidy's version of Paul Simon's "Mother and Child Reunion" plus a slew of authentically Hendrix-like tracks (also featuring former Experience bassist Noel Redding, AKA 'Clit McTorius'). In 1972 the album was released at virtually the same moment as Jo Jo Gunne's first, eponymous album that featured "Run, Run Run" and a Spirit album called Feedback that was recorded by Cassidy and Locke (who were Spirit's jazz influences) and guitarist/bassist brother duo Al and John Staehely, who wrote and sang most of the material on the LP.

Stairway to Heaven copyright dispute
In writing Led Zeppelin's "Stairway to Heaven", Jimmy Page allegedly lifted California's guitar riff from "Taurus", an instrumental song from the first Spirit album. Led Zeppelin was on the same bill as Spirit on two American music festival dates in 1969.  In the liner notes for the 1996 reissue of Spirit's first album, California stated: "people always ask me why 'Stairway to Heaven' sounds exactly like 'Taurus,' which was released two years earlier. I know Led Zeppelin also played 'Fresh Garbage' in their live set. They opened up for us on their first American tour". The fact that "Fresh Garbage" was a track from the same album that includes the song "Taurus" further suggested that Led Zeppelin was likely aware of the song enough to lead to a belated 2014 copyright infringement and injunction lawsuit against the reissue of Led Zeppelin IV, with the lawyer stating, "The idea behind this is to make sure that Randy California is given a writing credit on 'Stairway to Heaven'." In Led Zeppelin's January 1969 appearance at the Fillmore West, Jimmy Page breaks into an instrumental jam which clearly includes the Spirit song "Fresh Garbage".

In June 2016, after a trial that included audio recordings of several versions of both songs but not the Spirit and Led Zeppelin recordings, and also featured testimony from Page and bandmate Robert Plant explaining the songwriting process for "Stairway", a jury ruled that Page and Plant had not copied "Taurus". The decision came under appeal because the judge did not permit the two sound recordings to be played and instead allowed only sheet music.  Copyright law had been expanded to include sound recordings in 1974. In September 2018, this decision was overturned. A new trial was unanimously ordered by a three-judge panel of the 9th U.S. Circuit Court of Appeals in San Francisco on the basis that U.S. District Judge R. Gary Klausner gave jurors erroneous information about copyright law. The panel's decision was subsequently vacated when the Ninth Circuit voted to rehear the case en banc. In September 2019 the appeals court heard introductory arguments and began deliberations as to whether a new trial is in fact warranted. The main issue is that the recording of "Stairway to Heaven" resembles "Taurus" much more than does the printed sheet music, and comments by the court have indicated a possible inclination to hold that only the sheet music pertains to the copyright. On March 9, 2020, the Ninth Circuit ruled against California's estate and re-instated the June 2016 jury verdict. This ruling effectively eliminated the "inverse ratio" rule and could have tremendous impact on future copyright law in the recording industry. In October 2020, the Supreme Court of the United States refused to hear the case, leaving the Ninth Circuit's decision in place and effectively ending the dispute.

Death
California drowned in the Pacific Ocean in 1997 at the age of 45 while rescuing his 12-year-old son Quinn from a rip current near his mother's home at Molokai, Hawaii. He managed to push Quinn (who survived) toward the shore.

The Randy Craig Wolfe Trust was established after his death and, using royalties from California's recording contracts, financially supports the Randy California Project, an after-school music education program for underprivileged elementary school children in Ventura County.

Solo albums
 Kapt. Kopter and the (Fabulous) Twirly Birds (1972)
 Euro-American (1982)
 Restless (1985)
 Shattered Dreams (1986)
 The Euro-American Years, 1979–1983 (2007) 4-CD set

Videotaped performances
 Night of the Guitar, Hammersmith Odeon, London, November 26, 1988, CD: (IRSD-83000)
 Live at La Paloma Theatre, Encinitas, CA, MTV Video for the song "Hey Joe"

References

Other sources
 Gregory, Hugh. 1000 Great Guitarists. Rock, Jazz, Country, Funk ..., Balafon Books, 1994.
 Larkin, Colin. The Encyclopedia of Popular Music, 3rd edition, Macmillan, 1998.
 Larkin, Colin. The Guinness Encyclopedia of Popular Music, Guinness Publishing, 1992.
 The International Encyclopedia of Hard Rock & Heavy Metal, Sidgwick & Jackson, 1984.

External links
Randy California Tribute page with artwork by Jim Warren
 
 

1951 births
1997 deaths
Accidental deaths in Hawaii
American people of German-Jewish descent
American rock musicians
American male singer-songwriters
American rock guitarists
American rock singers
American rock songwriters
American Ashkenazi Jews
Deaths by drowning in the United States
Jewish American musicians
Jewish rock musicians
Guitarists from Los Angeles
People from Topanga, California
Spirit (band) members
20th-century American singers
Singers from Los Angeles
Lead guitarists
20th-century American guitarists
American male guitarists
20th-century American male singers
20th-century American Jews
Singer-songwriters from California